Egilberto Martufi (5 May 1926 – 1989) was an Italian long-distance runner. He competed in the marathon at the 1952 Summer Olympics.

References

External links
 

1926 births
1989 deaths
Athletes (track and field) at the 1952 Summer Olympics
Italian male long-distance runners
Italian male marathon runners
Olympic athletes of Italy
Athletes from Rome